Magic for Humans is an American reality television show. Its first season of six episodes was released on Netflix on August 17, 2018. The show features comedian and magician Justin Willman performing magic tricks for people on the street. He has said that the tricks actually happen as shown and are not edited.

Magic for Humans returned for a second season on December 4, 2019. On January 16, 2020, while appearing on The Tonight Show Starring Jimmy Fallon, Willman announced that Magic For Humans had been picked up for a third season. The third season was released on May 15, 2020.

Episodes

Season 1 (2018)

Season 2 (2019)

Season 3 (2020)

Special Celebrity Guests 

 Susan Sarandon, Season 2, Episode 1 (2019)
 Gogo Lomo-David, Season 1, Episode 4 (2018)
 Griffin Arnlund, Season 3, Episode 7 (2020)
 Andrew Lowe, Season 3, Episode 7 (2020)
 Tyrone Evans Clark, Season 3, Episode 3 (2020)
 Michael Vaccaro, Season 1, Episode 5 (2018)
 Mona Lee Wylde, Season 1, Episode 5 (2018)

References

External links 
 
 

2018 American television series debuts
American television magic shows
2010s American reality television series
English-language Netflix original programming
Television series by Abso Lutely Productions
2020s American reality television series